The Magpul FMG-9 is a prototype folding submachine gun, designed by Magpul Industries in 2008. It is made out of  polymer in place of metal, reducing weight. 
The FMG-9 never left the prototype stage, and never saw widespread production on any level, as the item was only produced by Magpul as a proof of concept.

Airsoft

In 2010, Magpul Industries' PTS (Professional Training and Simulation) Division in cooperation with KWA Performance Industries released the FPG (Folding Pocket Gun). The FPG is almost identical to the FMG-9 prototype, but contains the firing mechanism of an airsoft KWA G18C replica. The FPG fires 6mm pellets with a magazine capacity of 49 rounds.

FDP-9 
In 2021, Magpul unveiled the FDC-9 (Folding Defensive Carbine) and FDP-9 (Folding Defensive Pistol), two redesigned versions of the FMG-9, that are planned to release in 2022.

See also 
Ares FMG –  9mm Parabellum folding submachine gun designed by Francis Warin at Eugene Stoner's company in the mid-1980s
 PP-90 – Russian 9mm Makarov folding submachine gun by KBP (1990s).

References

External links
 

9mm Parabellum submachine guns
Trial and research firearms of the United States